This is a list of people who have served as Custos Rotulorum of Bedfordshire. Since 1711, the function of Custos Rotulorum has been carried out by the Lords Lieutenant of the county.

 John Mordaunt, 1st Baron Mordaunt bef. 1544 – aft. 1547
 Oliver St John, 1st Baron St John of Bletso bef. 1558 – 1582
 John St John, 2nd Baron St John of Bletso bef. 1584 – 1596
 Oliver St John, 3rd Baron St John of Bletso 1596–1618
 Thomas Wentworth, 1st Earl of Cleveland 1618–1667
 Oliver St John, 2nd Earl of Bolingbroke 1667–1681 jointly with
 Robert Bruce, 1st Earl of Ailesbury 1671–1685
 Thomas Bruce, 2nd Earl of Ailesbury 1685–1689
 Paulet St John, 3rd Earl of Bolingbroke 1689–1711
For later custodes rotulorum, see Lord Lieutenant of Bedfordshire.

References 
Institute of Historical Research- Custodes Rotulorum 1544-1646
Institute of Historical Research - Custodes Rotulorum 1660-1828

Local government in Bedfordshire
Bedfordshire